Season 1983–84 was the 100th football season in which Dumbarton competed at a Scottish national level, entering the Scottish Football League for the 78th time, the Scottish Cup for the 89th time and the Scottish League Cup for the 37th time.

Overview 
At the ninth time of asking, and in what was the club's 100th year of competitive football, Dumbarton managed to achieve that elusive promotion and a place in next season's Premier Division, although it was not to prove to be all 'plain sailing'.  Indeed, after 6 games, with 3 wins it was looking like another average 'middle of the table' campaign.  However an unbeaten run of 12 games was to follow changing the club's fortunes and Dumbarton were suddenly right up there with the 'front runners' - and then disaster struck!  Billy Lamont resigned his managerial post to take up the reins at fellow Division 1 club Falkirk.  Credit to Dumbarton that they had a new manager in Davie Wilson in place within two weeks, and the club guaranteed promotion with 2 games to play, although they were unable to catch champions Morton, who finished 3 points ahead.

In the Scottish Cup, after a fine win over Raith Rovers, Dumbarton lost to Division 1 'champions in waiting', Morton in the fourth round.

The League Cup format was again reorganised, with a first round being played before sectional games were introduced.  However the first tie against Premier Division Hibernian was to prove too much of a hurdle to get over.

Locally, in the Stirlingshire Cup, Dumbarton released their grip on the trophy with a loss in the first round to Alloa.

Results & fixtures

Scottish First Division

Scottish League Cup

Scottish Cup

Stirlingshire Cup

Pre-season matches

League table

Player statistics

Squad 

|}

Transfers
Amongst those players joining and leaving the club were the following:

Players in

Players out

Reserve team
Dumbarton competed in the Scottish Reserve League First Division (West), which was split into winter and spring series.

In the first series, of 12 fixtures, 6 were won and 3 drawn - and Dumbarton finished 5th of 13.  In the second series, 4 games were won and 2 drawn of 10 ties - but the league was never completed.

Trivia
 Between the league game against Raith Rovers on 25 February and the league game against Clydebank on 7 April, Tom Carson did not concede a single goal - a record of 655 minutes.
 The League match against Hamilton on 11 February marked Pat McGowan's 100th appearance for Dumbarton in all national competitions - the 88th Dumbarton player to reach this milestone.
 The League match against Raith Rovers on 25 February marked Donald McNeil's 200th appearance for Dumbarton in all national competitions - the 17th Dumbarton player to break the 'double century'.

See also
 1983–84 in Scottish football

References

External links
Scottish Football Historical Archive

Dumbarton F.C. seasons
Scottish football clubs 1983–84 season